The 2003–04 Munster Rugby season was Munster's third season competing in the Celtic League, alongside which they also competed in the Heineken Cup. It was Alan Gaffney's first season as head coach.

2003–04 squad

Pre-season

2003–04 Celtic League

2003–04 Celtic Cup

Quarter-final

2003–04 Heineken Cup

Pool 5

Quarter-final

Semi-final

References

External links
2003–04 Munster Rugby season official site 

2003–04
2003–04 in Irish rugby union